Buekorps (literally "Bow Corps" or "Archery Brigade") are traditional marching neighbourhood youth organizations in Bergen, Norway.

The tradition is unique to Bergen.  The organizations, which are called bataljoner (battalions), were first formally organized in the 1850s and are run entirely by the youths themselves. Fourteen different such battalions are active in Bergen, each belonging to a certain part of town.

In the past brigades were also formed in other Norwegian cities, but these were mostly defunct by the early 20th century.

Though the structure and ceremony of the Buekorps has military roots, the brigades are active in various other ways, ranging from physical activity and play to charitable work. Members range in age from about 7 to over 20, and adult veterans play a role in supporting the organizations and during certain events.

The groups consist of privates (usually carrying wooden rifles or crossbows), officers (older children with more seniority) and drummers. On that day they are a prominent and popular part of the parade through the streets of Bergen.

In addition, the buekorps have their own celebratory days. One of these is the day they celebrate the founding date of their battalion. Every fourth year is Buekorpsenes Dag (The Buekorps Day), a series of competitions and pageantry.

Background

The tradition dates back at least to the 19th century when children would imitate the adult militia soldiers performing close order drill.

Even from back to the days of Ludvig Holberg it is told of boys playing and marching on the streets of Bergen. The city militia fascinated boys in the 18th and 19th century. They would build their own "fortresses" where they would play and engage in "warfare" against other boy-gangs. Consul August Konow tells from his lifetime that at the end of the 18th century there existed boy-gangs and companies who marched around and engaged in "warfare" with each other. These gangs were called "Nordnæs Kompani" and "Nykirkealmeningens Kompani" and were direct copies of the town militia.

Governor Fredrik Hauch also tells from the same time about boy-gangs who were copying the town militia. Names like "fjeldeguttene" ("the Fjeldet-boys"), "markeguttene" ("the Marken-boys") and "dræggaguttene" ("the Dræggen-boys") were known at the end of the 18th century.

Johan Sebastian Welhaven with his poem 'børnelege' (children's games) from 1839 gives a picture of his childhood-years in 1814:
"Vi stilledes os siden i lange Rader, marsjerende tappert i byens gader ;vi plyndrede Søstrenes Dukkeskrin og gjorde Mundurer av silke og lin. I krigsraadet taltes med megen vekt om fienden stilling og skjulte planer, paa chefens kommando, vi stormede kjækt med skillingstrompeter, karduspapirfaner".

("We organized ourselves in long rows, marched bravely the streets of the city; we plundered our sisters' doll-boxes and made coats out of silk and linen. In the council of war we gravely discussed the enemy's position and secret plans, and on the command of the chief we charged with shilling trumpets and paper banners".)

Nils Hertzberg says of the 1830s: there were organized boy-gangs in the different neighbourhoods which under changing alliances gave each other full-blown battles: the Nordnæs-, Drægge-, Nøste- and Skive-Boys. They employed guards and scouts who made strategic moves to surprise the enemy.

In the 1850s these boy-gangs still rampaged, but the violence and hostility had to come to an end. Who it was that finally ended these hostilities and turned them into the current peaceful pursuits of the buekorps is uncertain.

History
Traditionally an activity exclusively for boys, the first girl buekorps was formed in 1991. This stirred some controversy in Bergen, but the girl and mixed gender battalions are now accepted by most people.

The buekorps tradition, even with many battalions experiencing trouble in keeping up the recruiting of new members, continues to be a popular and proud feature of Bergen, excepting the odd complaint about noise.

Lørdagskorps and Søndagskorps
Lørdagskorps ("Saturday-brigades") and Søndagskorps ("Sunday-brigades") are historically the two main types of buekorps. These terms originate from the day the brigades marched on. 
Saturday-brigades were composed of the sons of those who could afford to take a day off on Saturday to march. The three surviving Saturday-brigades are Nordnæs Bataillon, Nygaards Bataljon and Dræggens Buekorps.

Sunday-brigades were the ones from working-class neighbourhoods where the children had to work on Saturdays, and thus could not march on any other day. Most of the brigades were Sunday-brigades. Some of these brigades came from such poor families that they could not afford real uniforms, wearing instead ornate shirts. Today, Laksevågs Bueskyttere and Løvstakkens Jægerkorps still march in these shirts.

The current brigades
 Dræggens Buekorps (24 March 1856), – Dræggens Archery Company, boys brigade 
 Eidsvaags Kompani (28 April 2008) "Eidsvaags Værve Kompani", Boys brigade.
 Fjeldets Bataljon (22 May 1857), Fjeldets Battalion, boys brigade 
 Laksevågs Bueskyttere (8 May 1894), Laksevåg's Archerers, boys brigade 
 Lungegaardens Buekorps (7 October 1994), Lungegaarden's Archery Company, girls brigade 
 Løvstakkens Jægerkorps (11 May 1903-18, 30 April 1928-64, 11 May 1999-), Løvstakken's Jeger Company, mixed brigade  
 Markens Bataljon (4 June 1859), Marken's Battalion, boys brigade 
 Mathismarkens Bataljon (15 June 1887), Mathismarken's Battalion, boys brigade
 Nordnæs Bataillon (3 May 1858), Nordnæs' Battalion, boys brigade 
 Nygaards Bataljon (14 June 1857), Nygaard's Battalion, boys brigade 
 Sandvikens Bataljon (17 May 1857), Sandviken's Battalion, boys brigade 
 Skansens Bataljon (22 May 1860), Skansen's Battalion, boys brigade 
 Skutevikens Buekorps (8 July 1853), Skuteviken's Archery Company, boys brigade 
 Sydnæs Bataljon (7 June 1863), Sydnæs' Battalion, boys brigade 
 Wesselengens Bataljon (24 April 1873), Wesselengen's Battalion, boys brigade

Former brigades in Bergen
Since the 1850s there may have existed more than 200 different brigades overall. Dates of foundation and discontinuation are often unknown. Known brigades are listed here:

 
 Allegatens Bataljon
 Asylplass Bataljon
 Baglergatens Kompani (1911-18?)
 Baneveiens Bataljon
 Bingen Hellebardkorps
 Bingen Jegerkorps
 Blauengens Kompani
 Blekebakkens Kompani
 Bispengens Kompani
 Bjørgvin Compagni (1869)
 Bjørgvins Kompani (1932-36)
 Boligens Kordekorps (Ladegårdskorpset) (?-1895)
 Boligens Kårdekorps (Henrik Wergelands korpset) (?-1888)
 Borgerskolens (Buekorps?)
 Breistølsveiens Kompani (1889-1925?)
 Bødkergadens Kompagni
 Bønes Batalion
 Christinegaard Bataljon (1938-40)
 Damsgårds Batalion
 Det raske Fjellkorps (1876-79)
 Dokkens Kompagni
 Dragefjellskorpset (1881-?)
 Eidemarkens (Buekorps?)
 Ekrenbakkens Kompani
 Elvegatens Kompagni
 Engens Buekorps
 Fastings Buekorps (?-1860s?)
 Fjeldets Kompani (1895-?)
 Fjellborgs Kompani (1924-29)
 Fjøsanger Kompani (1950-60s?)
 Fredrikbergsgatens Kompani
 Fridalens Kompani (1950s?)
 Fæstningens Buekorps (?-1862)
 Granbakken Jægerkorps
 Granesmugets Kompani (1913-39?)
 Grønnevoldgatens Kompagni
 Grønnevolds Kompagni
 Gyldenpris Kompani
 Gørbitzgatens Kompani
 Hans Haugesgate Kompani (1920-33)
 Haugens Bataljon
 Haugens Buekorps
 Haugesmugets Kompani
 Haugeveiens Kompani
 Heiens Kompani
 Holmens Kompani
 Hop Bataljon (1918-22) 
 Høggeblokkens Kompani (1912-20?)
 Isdalens Kårdekorps
 Jektevikens Kompani
 Kalmarhavens Compagni
 Kippersmauets Bataljon (1930-33)
 Kirkegatens Jægerkorps (1920-47)
 Kleivens Buekorps (1850s?-?)
 Klokkerhagens Kompani
 Korskirkealmeningens Kompani (1904?-13)
 Krohnengens Bataljon
 Krohnvikens Bataljon (1852–1916)
 Kronstad Bataljon (1922-63)
 Ladegaardens Bataljon (21 April 1880-85, 1889–1921, 1924-70)
 Ladegårdens Compagni (1891-1917?)
 Laksevåg Bataljon (1872–1940)
 Langeveiens Kompani (1920-26)
 Langhauens Kompani
 Legdenes Kompani (1 April 1956-61)
 Lille Markens Kompagni
 Lille Dræggens Buekorps
 Løvstakkveien Kompani
 Markeveiens Compagni
 Markeveiens Jægerkorps (1880s)
 Martin Vahlsgates Kompani (1901-28)
 Meyermarkens Kompani (1905-20)
 Minde Bataljon (1950s?) 
 Mulelvens Bataljon
 Mulens Bataljon (14 June 1898-1903, 1911-17, 1920-57, 1980-84)
 Muralmendingens Companie (1880s)
 Møhlenpris Kompani (1895–1912, ?-1923)
 Natland Bataljon (1959-63)
 Nedre Stølens Kompani (1898-1904?)
 Nessets Bataljon
 Nordnes Lekeplads Kompani (1918-28)
 Nordre Møhlenpris Kompani
 Nordre Skutevikens Kompani (1928-39)
 Nordre Skuteviksveiens Kompani (1928-39)
 Nye Sandviksvei Kompani
 Nykirkealmeningens Kompani (1875?-1916)
 Nymarks Kompani
 Nøstets Batalion (7 May 1870-1961)
 Nøstets Kårdekorps (bef. 1855-70)
 Olav Rustiesgates Kompani (1972-80)
 Paaschemarkens Bataljon 
 Paradis Bataljon
 Parkens Compagni
 Persenbakkens Kompani (1928-32)
 Planens Kompani (1956-65, 1974-82)
 Rennebanens Kompani (1920-25?)
 Repslagersgatens Jægerkompani (1918-38)
 Rosenbergsgatens Bataljon
 Rothaugens Kompani (1932-34, 1988-90?)
 Sandviksveiens Buekorps
 Scjadenbergshavens Kompani (1910-30)
 Skanseliens Kompani (1932-57?)
 Skivens Kårdekorps
 Skytterbanens bataljon
 Slettens Bataljon (1959-65?)
 Slottsgatens Kompani
 Smaa-Skansens Bataljon
 Smørsalmendingens Companie (1880s)
 Solheims Bataljon (1927-30s, 1946-50s)
 Storemøllens Compani
 Strandveiens Bataillon
 Strandgatens Jægerkorps
 Strangehagens Kompani
 Stupets Bataljon (1952-56)
 Stølens Kompani (1860-65?, 1947-48)
 Svanevikens Kompani
 Sverresborg Jegerkorps (1902-12)
 Sverresgatens Jægerkorps
 Sydnæskleivens Kårdekorps
 Tamburengens Jægerkorps (1904-10?)
 Teatergatens (Kompani?)
 Toldbodalmendingens Compagni
 Trangesmauets Kompani (1875?-1932)
 Tverrgatens Kompani (1918-31, 1955-57)
 Utsiktens Kompani (1974-75)
 Vardens Kompagni (1965-75)
 Vaskerelvssmugets Compagnie
 Verftets Kompani (1871-73, 18 March 1894-1961)
 Verftets Kompani II (1874-?)
 Verftets Kårdekorps (1873-74)
 Victor Müllers (Buekorps?)
 Vognstølbakken Bataljon
 Vågens Bataljon (1 June 1991-27 April 2008)
 Ytre Sandvikens Bataljon
 Øvregadens Buekorps (1875-1912?)

Former brigades in other cities
In the past there have also existed buekorps in other cities. However, they were mostly defunct by the early 20th century. It is somewhat uncertain to what degree all of these were to the original tradition of buekorps. They did anyway start after inspiration of the buekorps of Bergen. Known ones are listed here:

 
Arendal
 Arendals Yngre Guttekompani
Bodø
 Bodø Guttekorps
Drammen
 Bragerøens Buekorps
 Guttekorpset Birkebeineren
 St. Olafklevens Buekorps
Flekkefjord
 1:ste Buekorps Flekkefjord
 Fjeldgatens Guttekorps
 Flekkefjord Buekorps
Fredrikstad
 Fredrikstad Buekorps
Gjøvik
 Gjøvik Guttekorps
Grimstad
 Grimstad Guttekorps 
Hamar
 Hamar Guttegarde
Haugesund
 Grønhaugens Turnforening (buekorps)
 Haraldsgadens Buekorps
 Hasseløens Buekorps
 Haugesunds Buekorps
 Haugesunds Garde
 Risøens Buekorps
Hemnesberget
 Hemnes Guttekorps
Kristiansund
 Storgatens Guttekorps
Levanger
 Levanger Buekorps
Molde
 Molde Guttekorps 
Nordfjordeid
 Eids Guttegarde
 Eids Guttekorps
Oslo
 Christiania Garde
 Løven (1868-?)
 Urania Garde (?-1905)
Sandnes
 Sandnes Buekorps
Sandnessjøen
 Sandnessjøen Guttekorps
Stavanger
 Kongsgaard Buekorps
 Nylunds Buekorps
 Stavanger Buekorps
 Svithuns Buekorps 
Steinkjer
 Nordsiden Buekorps
 Stenkjær Guttekorps
Tingvold
 Tingvolds Guttekorps
Tromsø
 Tromsø Guttekorps
Vardø
 Løvepatruljen
Volden
 Voldens Guttekorps
Ålesund
 Rød Garden Tiger
 Viking Garden
 Aalesunds Garde

References
1 - 12 Individual web pages for the brigades

External links

Buekorpsene.com

 
Youth organisations based in Norway